Urnyak (Ürnäk) is a rural locality (a selo) and the administrative centre of Urnyaksky Selsoviet, Chekmagushevsky District, Bashkortostan, Russia. The population was 665 as of 2010. There are 10 streets.

Geography 
Urnyak is located 15 km southeast of Chekmagush (the district's administrative centre) by road. Nur is the nearest rural locality.

References 

Rural localities in Chekmagushevsky District